Kalmet is a predominantly Estonian language surname. Notable people with this surname include:

 Gita Kalmet (born 1959), Estonian diplomat and actress
  (1931–1982), Estonian actor and theatre director 
 Henrik Kalmet (born 1986), Estonian actor and comedian
 Karl-Andreas Kalmet (born 1989), Estonian actor
 Leo Kalmet (1900–1975), Estonian theatre director
 Madis Kalmet (born 1955),  Estonian actor and theatre director
  (1936–1983), Estonian actor
  (1911–2006), Estonian agricultural scientist

Estonian-language surnames